Mechuka Advanced Landing Ground  is an Indian Air Force airstrip located at Mechuka in Shi Yomi district of Arunachal Pradesh, India. It is an Advance Landing Ground (ALG) of Indian Air Force.

History

In June 2019, An Indian Air Force Plane carrying 13 en route from Jorhat Airport in Assam went missing while en route to the airstrip. The aircraft's wreckage was found in the Siang district after eight days after being spotted by an MI 17 helicopter that was on a search & rescue mission.

Military usage

The area has a significant military presence, which also creates some employment opportunities for civilians. The airstrip is used frequently to bring in vital supplies from Assam via Antonov-32 aircraft and helicopters. The runway was renovated, strengthened, upgraded to a concrete runway and extended to 4,700 feet in 2017 by the government.

Civil aviation usage

There is a twice-weekly helicopter service offered under the UDAN scheme on Monday and Saturday. Government of Arunachal Pradesh has invited bids from the private airlines to operate a 9-searter fixed-wing air service which will not be under the UDAN scheme.

As of December 2022, the new passenger terminal for handling passenger traffic is almost completed, and is expected to begin operations soon with Alliance Air's Dornier 228 passenger aircraft.

See also

 Military bases 
 List of ALGs
 List of Indian Air Force stations
 India-China military deployment on LAC
 List of disputed India-China areas
 Tianwendian
 Ukdungle

 Borders
 Line of Actual Control (LAC)
 Borders of China
 Borders of India
 
 Conflicts
 Sino-Indian conflict
 List of disputed territories of China
 List of disputed territories of India

 Other related topics
 India-China Border Roads
 List of extreme points of India
 Defence Institute of High Altitude Research
 Indian Astronomical Observatory

References

External links 
 IAF's ALG

Shi Yomi district
Airports in Arunachal Pradesh
Indian Air Force bases
Airports with year of establishment missing